Powązki Cemetery is a major cemetery in Warsaw
Powązki Military Cemetery is a major military cemetery in Warsaw

Powązki may also refer to the following villages:
Powązki, Warsaw West County
Powązki, Żyrardów County